The Calgary Buffaloes were a Junior A ice hockey team in the Alberta Junior Hockey League based out of Calgary, Alberta. They were one of the five founding members of the AJHL in 1963.

The Buffaloes captured the AJHL title each of their first three seasons, earning the right to face the Edmonton Oil Kings for the right to play for the Memorial Cup. All three seasons, the Buffaloes were defeated by the powerful Oil Kings.

In 1965, the cross-town Calgary Cowboys withdrew from the AJHL with most of their players moving to the Buffaloes. Prior to the 1966–67 season, the Buffaloes renamed themselves the Cowboys, as a new Western Canada Junior Hockey League team took over the Buffaloes name. The team would retain the Cowboys moniker until it folded midway through the 1969–70 season.

Season-by-season Record

Note: GP = Games played, W = Wins, L = Losses, T = Ties, Pts = Points, GF = Goals for, GA = Goals against

1No regular season was played in 1963–64, League had a playoff only to determine champion
2Folded after 25 games.  Remaining 25 games were forefitted to the five remaining clubs
Note:Stats prior to 1969-70 have been lost to the Alberta Junior Hockey League

See also
List of ice hockey teams in Alberta
Ice hockey in Calgary
Calgary Canucks
Calgary Spurs
Calgary Royals

References
Alberta Junior Hockey League website
AJHL Annual Guide & Record Book 2006-07

Defunct Alberta Junior Hockey League teams
Buffaloes, Calgary
Defunct ice hockey teams in Alberta
Ice hockey clubs established in 1963
Defunct junior ice hockey teams in Canada
1963 establishments in Alberta
1970 disestablishments in Alberta